Maccabi Jaffa Football Club was one of the first football teams in Israel. It was founded in 1950 as "Zionist association of Maccabi Jaffa," by Jewish immigrants from Bulgaria.

The Team played for 32 seasons in the Israeli Top Division, though its only title was The Israeli Toto Cup for the Second Division. Maccabi Jaffa finished three times at the second place in the Israeli First Division (in the seasons of 1962, 1964 and 1977). In 1957, Maccabi Jaffa played at the final of the Israeli State Cup, but lost to Hapoel Petah Tikva. 

The club disbanded in 2000. In 2007, a phoenix club Maccabi Kabilio Jaffa was founded by their fans after 7 years of other unsuccessful attempts to revive the club.

History

The Early Years

Zionist association of Maccabi Jaffa was founded in 1949 by Albert Kiyosso (1898–1963), the chairman of Maccabi Bulgaria organization who immigrated to Israel in 1943. In the early 1950s, the members received a surface of abandoned orchard due to lack of funds, the members qualified the surface by themselves and built the club's stadium which was nicknamed "The Tins Stadium." In the season of 1954–1955 Maccabi Jaffa played in the promotion play-offs for the Israeli top division with Hapoel Kfar-Saba, Hapoel Kiryat Haim, and Beitar Jerusalem. Jaffa won the Play-offs and promoted for the first time to the Israeli major league.

During the 1950s Maccabi Jaffa was struggling in the bottom part of the Israeli First Division. The peak of this period was in the season of 1956–1957 when Maccabi Jaffa participated in the final of The Israeli State Cup, though they lost 2–1 to Hapoel Petah Tikva.

The 1960s 

In the 1960s, Maccabi Jaffa was close twice to win the championship.

In the Season of 1961–1962 Maccabi Jaffa, coached by Vasil Spasov finished second in the Israeli Major League, only 2 points from the champions, Hapoel Petah Tikva.

The season of 1963–1964 considered the best season of Maccabi Jaffa history. In this season Maccabi Jaffa fought the championship against Hapoel Ramat Gan. In the games between the teams, Jaffa had won 3–1 in Ramat Gan, and 1–0 in Jaffa, but that wasn't enough. Ramat Gan won the Championship, only 1 point above Maccabi Jaffa. In that season, Maccabi Jaffa striker Israel Ashkenazi was Israel's top scorer with 21 goals.

In the late 1960s, Jaffa failed to show the same quality as in their top years, and in the season of 1969–1970 Maccabi Jaffa finished in the 15th position, and was relegated to the second division, after 14 years in the top division.

The 1970s 
Maccabi Jaffa had started the 1970s in the second division. In the season of 1970–1971 Maccabi Jaffa got their revenge in Hapoel Ramat Gan, after winning 1–0 in the last game of the season in Jaffa, and promoting back to the top division at the expense of Hapoel Ramat Gan.

The rest of the 1970s, Jaffa was a mediocre team in the Israeli first division. The only season worth mentioning is 1976–1977. in this year, Jaffa was once again close to be the champions. Jaffa finished in the second place, after Maccabi Tel Aviv, that's after Jaffa beat Maccabi Tel Aviv in both games of that season.

The 1980s 
Jaffa's first season in the 1980s was promising, as the team finished in the third place, but from there everything went wrong.

Jaffa became a bottom league team, until in the season of 1986–1987, when Jaffa finished in the 15th place and was relegated to the second division after 16 successive years in the first division.

Jaffa did not succeed to promote to the first division in the 1980s, and finished the next seasons in mid-table of Liga Artzit, the second division at the time.

The 1990s 
The first years of the 1990s seem good for Maccabi Jaffa. In the season of 1991–1992 Jaffa finished in the sixth place, but won their first title ever: Israeli Toto Cup of the Liga Artzit.

Jaffa won the Toto Cup of Liga Artzit again in the next season, and finished in fourth place, which earned the team a promotion play-off against Hapoel Petah Tikva, who finished in the 14th place in the first division. Jaffa lost 1–2 and 0–3 and remained in the second division.

In the season of 1994–1995 Jaffa finished in the first place, and promoted to the first division after 8 years in the second division.

The season of 1995–1996 was not good for The Bulgarians, as Jaffa finished in the bottom place and relegated back to the second division after only one season.

Jaffa came back to life in the season of 1997–1998. That season is considered one of the best in the club's history. The team finished the league in the first place, with only one lose (to Maccabi Kiryat Gat). Jaffa's striker Ofir Haim was the top scorer of the season with 26 goals.  Moreover, Jaffa won the Toto Cup of Liga Artzit for the third time.

The season of 1998–1999 was the 32 and last season of Maccabi Jaffa in Israel's top division. That season was the worst in Jaffa's history and one of the worst in Israel's top division history. Jaffa finished the season in the bottom place, with 2 wins, 4 ties and 24 losses (10 points out of 90). In spite of the poor season, Maccabi Jaffa beat Maccabi Haifa 1–0 in the 29th game and denied Maccabi Haifa a spot in next season's UEFA Cup.

Jaffa started the season of 1999–2000 in the second division, but after only one game (in which they won 1–0 against Tzafririm Holon), The club was demoted by the Israel Football Association to the fourth division for violation of the budget rules. Because Jaffa got in deep debts, The club changed its name to Maccabi Jaffa 2000 and finished the season in the 9th place. At the end of the season, the club was dissolved after failing to comply with arbitrator decisions and fielding ineligible player.

Successor clubs

The dissolved club merged with A.S. Ramat Eliyahu, where most of the club players left for. A.S. Ramat Eliyahu played at Gaon Stadium and used Maccabi Jaffa's crest.

The "new" Maccabi Jaffa, A.S. Ramat Eliyahu, targeted to promotion to the third division, but failed consistently.

In the season of 2006–2007 the team finished in the second bottom place and relegated to the fifth division. During the years, the club merged with the clubs Tzeirei Jaffa, Hatzrot Jaffa and Bnei Jaffa and in 2008 became S.C. Bnei Jaffa. Following that, the club no longer played in Maccabi Jaffa's Stadium, and no longer played with Maccabi Jaffa's logo.

Before the beginning of the 2008–09 season, some of Maccabi Jaffa's old fans gathered and reestablished the team under the name Maccabi Kabilio Jaffa; the team is being called after its goalkeeper in the 1970s Herzl Kabilio who died from cancer at the age of 35. The club is a fan's club, and gains its money from the donations made by the fans. The team was registered for the 2008–09 season for the bottom league in Israel, Liga Gimel.

Honours
Second tier
Champions 1954–55, 1970–71, 1994–95, 1997–98
Toto Cup Artzit
Winners 1991–92, 1992–93, 1997–98

References

External links
 Maccabi Kabilio Jaffa – The Official Website 
Maccabi Jaffa Kabilio Israel Football Association 

 
Jaffa
Jaffa
Football clubs in Tel Aviv
Association football clubs established in 1949
Association football clubs disestablished in 2000
1949 establishments in Israel
2000 disestablishments in Israel
Bulgarian Jews in Israel
Arab-Israeli football clubs